Lai Tak Tsuen is a public housing estate at 2 – 38 Lai Tak Tsuen Road, Tai Hang, Causeway Bay, Hong Kong. Built in 1975, it is one of the first public housing developments in Hong Kong. It was the second self-funded rental project of the Hong Kong Housing Society. The housing estate was named after a Hong Kong government officer, Michael Wright, who had served the Government of Hong Kong for more than 30 years.

History
The Hong Kong Housing Society announced its plan to build the housing estate in January 1969. Its construction was originally planned to be finished in 1972, but was delayed by a landslide. As a result, the first building, Tsuen Wing Lau, was completed in May 1975. The rest was completed in 1976.

The housing estate was an award-winning design in the 1970s.

In September 1999, Lai Tak Tsuen was awarded the ISO 9001 certification by the Hong Kong Quality Assurance Agency for its design and provision of property management services. 

From 2002 to 2005, Lai Tak Tsuen was one of the ten public housing estates with the lowest average volume of waste produced; hence, it was commended in the Waste Reduction Credit Scheme organised by the Hong Kong Housing Authority.

In 2016, a circular atrium of Lai Tak Tsuen was used as a location for the filming of the live-action film Ghost in the Shell.

Configuration
The estate consists of three houses, i.e. high-rise blocks of flats, with 2,677 flats. 

The population of the housing estate is currently 11,140. 
Other than residential blocks, the estate also provides carparks, shops, market stalls, a kindergarten, a children's centre, a youth centre, an elderly centre, a library, basketball court and a children's playground.

Houses
Lai Tak Tsuen consists of three buildings:
 Lai Kit Lau which is at 38 Lai Tak Tsuen Road, 
 Tak Chuen Lau which is at 36 Lai Tak Tsuen Road and 
 Tsuen Wing Lau which is at 16 Lai Tak Tsuen Road. 

Two of the buildings, Lai Kit Lau and Tak Chuen Lau, in Lai Tak Tsuen are Hong Kong's only public rental buildings having bicyclindrical design.

Demographics
According to the 2016 population by-census, Lai Tak Tsuen has a population of 6,700. 98% of the population is of Chinese ethnicity. The median monthly domestic household income is HK$16,550.

Politics
Lai Tak Tsuen is located in Tin Hau constituency of the Wan Chai District Council. It was formerly represented by Chan Yuk-lam, who was elected in the 2019 elections until July 2021.

Education
Lai Tak Tsuen is in Primary One Admission (POA) School Net 12. Within the school net are multiple aided schools (operated independently but funded with government money) and the following government schools: Hennessy Road Government Primary School and Sir Ellis Kadoorie (Sookunpo) Primary School.

References

External links

 Hong Kong Housing Society: Lai Tak Tsuen
 Orthophoto of Lai Tak Tsuen in Google Map

Public housing estates in Hong Kong
Tai Hang
Wan Chai District
Housing estates with centralized LPG system in Hong Kong